Plazac is a commune in the Dordogne department in Nouvelle-Aquitaine in southwestern France. It is near the village of Les Eyzies and the city of Sarlat-la-Canéda. 

The bishops of Périgueux built a fortified residence in Plazac in the 12th-13th century. Its donjon was transformed into a bell tower in the 17th century. Its chapel is now the village church. One wing of the residence has been preserved. 

During World War II, Plazac sheltered the residents of Bootzheim (Alsace) who were evacuated.

Population

See also
Communes of the Dordogne department

References

Communes of Dordogne
Dordogne communes articles needing translation from French Wikipedia